Gloriana Pellissier (born 12 August 1976) is an Italian ski mountaineer and mountain runner.

Biography
Pellissier was born  in Aosta. She started ski mountaineering in 1995 and competed first in the Tour du Rutor race in 1996. She has been member of the national team since 1999. Pellissier is married with two children.

Selected results (ski mountaineering)

Ski mountaineering 
Pellissier was Italian Champion in a row from 1997 to 2001 and from 2004 to 2005.
 1996:
 1st, Tour du Rutor (together with Persida Favre)
 1997:
 1st, Tour du Rutor (together with Persida Favre)
 1998:
 1st, Dolomiti Cup single
 1st, Lagorai – Cima d’Asta – Memorial „Egidio Battisti – Lino Vesco
 2nd, Trofeo Kima
 1999:
 1st, Tour du Rutor (together with Corinne Favre)
 3rd, Trofeo Kima
 2000:
 1st, French national ranking
 1st, Trofeo Kima
 1st, Tour du Rutor (together with Arianna Follis)
 2001:
 1st, Trophée des Gastlosen (European Cup, together with Aléxia Zuberer)
 1st, Italian Cup
 3rd, European Championship team race (together with Aléxia Zuberer)
 2002:
 1st, Italian Cup
 1st, Dolomiti Cup team (together with Aléxia Zuberer)
 1st, Lagorai – Cima d’Asta – Memorial „Egidio Battisti – Lino Vesco
 1st, Transacavallo (together with Alexia Zubérer)
 2nd, World Championship single race
 2nd, Trofeo Kima
 2nd, Trophée des Gastlosen (together with Aléxia Zuberer)
 3rd, World Championship combination ranking
 4th, World Championship team race (together with Chiara Raso)
 2004:
 1st, Tour du Rutor (together with Christiane Nex)
 2nd, World Championship single race
 3rd, World Championship vertical race
 3rd, World Championship relay race (together with Annamaria Baudena and Christiane Nex)
 2005:
 2nd, European Championship single race
 2nd, European Championship vertical race
 2nd, European Championship relay race (together with Francesca Martinelli and Christiane Nex)
 6th, European Championship team race (together with Christiane Nex)
 2006:
 1st, World Championship relay race (together with Francesca Martinelli, Chiara Raso and Roberta Pedranzini)
 1st, Dolomiti Cup single
 1st, Tour du Rutor (together with Gabrielle Magnenat)
 4th, World Championship vertical race
 2007:
 1st, European Championship relay race (together with Francesca Martinelli and Roberta Pedranzini)
 1st, Tour du Rutor (together with Laëtitia Roux)
 3rd, European Championship single race
 3rd, European Championship vertical race
 2008:
 2nd, World Championship relay race (together with Roberta Pedranzini, Francesca Martinelli and Elisa Fleischmann)
 5th, World Championship single race
 5th, World Cup race single
 10th, World Championship vertical race
 2009:
 1st, European Championship relay race (together with Roberta Pedranzini and Francesca Martinelli)
 8th, European Championship single race
 8th, European Championship vertical race
 2011:
 1st, Tour du Rutor (together with Mireia Miró Varela)
 2012:
 3rd, European Championship relay, together with Elena Nicolini and Martina Valmassoi
 6th, European Championship vertical race

Trofeo Mezzalama 

 1999: 1st, together with Danielle Hacquard and Véronique Lathuraz
 2001: 1st, together with Arianna Follis and Aléxia Zuberer
 2005: 1st, together with Christiane Nex and Natascia Leonardi Cortesi
 2007: 1st, together with Francesca Martinelli and Roberta Pedranzini
 2011: 1st, together with Francesca Martinelli and Roberta Pedranzini

Pierra Menta 

 1998: 4th, together with Corinne Roux Mollard
 1999: 2nd, together with Corinne Favre
 2000: 1st, together with Aléxia Zuberer
 2001: 1st, together with Aléxia Zuberer
 2009: 4th, together with Corinne Clos

Sky running 
Pellisier won the Mezzalama Skyrace from 2000 to 2002, and from 2004 to 2008. She won the Sentiero 4 Luglio SkyMarathon in 1999, 2000, 2006 and 2008, and the half marathon of the event in 2004 and 2007.

References

External links 
 Gloriana Pellissier at SkiMountaineering.org

1976 births
Living people
Italian female ski mountaineers
Ski mountaineers of Gruppo Sportivo Esercito
World ski mountaineering champions
People from Aosta
Italian female mountain runners
Italian sky runners
Sportspeople from Aosta Valley